Wittenberg is a district in the east of Saxony-Anhalt, Germany. Neighboring districts are (from west clockwise) Anhalt-Bitterfeld, the district-free city of Dessau-Roßlau, the districts of Potsdam-Mittelmark, Teltow-Fläming and Elbe-Elster in Brandenburg, and the district of Nordsachsen in Saxony. The capital and largest city is Wittenberg, famous for its association with the influential religious reformer Martin Luther and containing a UNESCO World Heritage Site.

History 
In 1994 the district was merged with the district of Jessen and a small part of the district of Gräfenhainichen. In 2007, 27 municipalities from the former district Anhalt-Zerbst were added to the district of Wittenberg.

Geography 
The main rivers in the district are the Elbe and its tributary, the Schwarze Elster.

Coat of arms 
The coat of arms show two swords which is the symbol of a field marshal in the Holy Roman Empire. This title was bestowed upon the counts of Saxony, who therefore added the symbol to their coat of arms. The center of the principality of Saxony was located in the area now covered by the district.

Towns and municipalities 

The district of Wittenberg consists of the following towns:

Annaburg
Bad Schmiedeberg 
Coswig
Gräfenhainichen
Jessen (Elster) 
Kemberg 
Oranienbaum-Wörlitz
Wittenberg 
Zahna-Elster

After the resolution of 6 October 2005, as part of municipal reform, the (then) 27 towns and municipalities of the former Verwaltungsgemeinschaften of Coswig and Wörlitzer Winkel, formerly in the Anhalt-Zerbst district, were assigned to Wittenberg district on 1 July 2007.

Sights

External links

References

 
Districts of Saxony-Anhalt
Former states and territories of Saxony-Anhalt